Liddel may refer to:

People 
Darren Liddel (born 1971), weightlifting competitor for New Zealand
Dick Liddel (1852–1901), American outlaw, member of the James-Younger Gang
Duncan Liddel (1561–1613), Scottish mathematician, physician and astronomer

Places 
Liddel Castle, ruined castle in Liddesdale, Roxburghshire in the Scottish Borders area of Scotland
Liddel Strength, ancient monument near Carwinley, Cumbria, in northwest England
Liddel Water, river running through southern Scotland and northern England

See also
Liddell
Lidl